The Legislative Council of Prince Edward Island was the upper house of the Legislature of the Canadian province of Prince Edward Island.  It existed from 1773 to 1893. Members were appointed by the lieutenant governor of Prince Edward Island on the advice of the premier until 1862 when it became an elected body. In 1893, the Legislative Council and House of Assembly were amalgamated into the Legislative Assembly of Prince Edward Island, a unicameral body with an assemblyman and councillor elected from each electoral district.

See also
Legislative Council

1773 establishments in Prince Edward Island
1893 disestablishments in Prince Edward Island
Defunct upper houses in Canada
General Assembly of Prince Edward Island